North Carroll High School was a public high school located in Hampstead, Maryland, United States, in Carroll County.

The North Carroll High School building is located at 1400 Panther Drive. The school was one of three county schools that were closed in 2016 due to declining enrollment. The school mascot was a panther, and the school colors were red, white, and black. The school was a part of the Carroll County Public Schools system. The principal was Thomas Clowes.

History
In September 1956, Manchester High School and Hampstead High School were consolidated into a new school, to be called North Carroll High School, in Greenmount. The school had 437 students and 20 faculty, and its first graduating class had 79 students. At that time, the school colors were red and gray.

It has been accredited by the Middle States Association of Colleges and Secondary Schools since 1960.

In 1962, the school had its name changed to "North Carroll Junior-Senior High School", due to the addition of 7th and 8th grade classes, for whom an additional facility was constructed.

Further expansion in the 1970s led to the construction of another new building in the current location near Hampstead, Maryland. 860 high school students and 45 staff members to the new building, the opening of which coincided with the name returning to North Carroll High School. This was also when the current school colors were established.

In 1985 an agriculture classroom and shop were added and the greenhouse relocated. In 2007 the shop closed and was replaced with an attendance room.

North Carroll High School celebrated its 50th anniversary during the 2006–2007 school year. Currently, North Carroll High School's student body has exceeded 1,800 students.

The student body of the school was recently split in the 2009-2010 school year with the opening of Manchester Valley High School in Manchester, Maryland. This split was due to over-population in the school. About 5-10 new portables were added to the school's campus to fit all the students into classes. The Board of Education had drawn out new boundaries for the school. They split the line between Manchester, a surrounding town, and Hampstead. The population of both these towns used to attend North Carroll High School and even a few from a third town called Finksburg. This was the cause of the continuous rise of population in the school. All Freshman, Sophomore, and Junior students living in Manchester were sent to the new high school. The Senior class of 2010 was allowed to stay at North Carroll High School.

In 2015, it was rumored that the school would be closed at the end of the 2015-2016 school year. However, Governor Larry Hogan allocated money to postpone the closure due to public disapproval of the closing.

On December 9, 2015 despite the public disapproval of the closing and offer of money from Governor Larry Hogan the Carroll County School Board voted to close the school.

Events

The school had an annual homecoming for the students and alumni. Usually taking place in October there was a football game set up against an opposing team taking place on a Friday night. The next day there was a homecoming dance for all students and one date/guest of their choice to attend. The dance took place in the main gym with surrounding decorations and a hired DJ. Appropriate attire must be worn at all times.

Other dances include Winter Formal, Spring Fling, Bay Lady, and Prom. Bay Lady is restricted to seniors and takes place on a boat with dinner and dancing. Prom is for Juniors and Seniors only and is typically planned by the Senior Class.

Other activities the school has offered are Mr./Mrs. North Carroll (a talent show in which students participate), North Carroll Idol (a take-off of American Idol), Flag Football Tournament, Senior Class Trip, Senior Class Picnic, Powder Puff Tournament (where the Junior girls play the Senior girls in flag football and the boys of the two classes are the cheerleaders), and many more.

Students
The student population at North Carroll High School has been steadily rising over the past 13 years.

Sports
North Carroll High School has won the following State Championships:

 Boys' Cross Country: 1985, 1988
 Girls' Cross Country: 1983, 1984, 1985, 1986, 2000
 Volleyball: 1985
 Field Hockey: 1977, 2013, 2014
 Wrestling: 1994
 Softball: 1978, 1979, 1981, 1986, 1990, 1991
 Boys' Track & Field: 1959
 Girls' Track & Field: 1984, 1985
 Girls' Indoor Track & Field: 2007
 Golf: 2010
 Boys' Soccer: 2013, 2015

Notable alumni
 Katie Zaferes, triathlete
 Steve Suter, American and Canadian football player

References and notes

External links
 North Carroll High School website

Carroll County Public Schools (Maryland)
Hampstead, Maryland
Educational institutions established in 1956
Public high schools in Maryland
1956 establishments in Maryland
2016 disestablishments in Maryland